The Singleton Bank rail crash occurred on 16 July 1961 near Weeton, Lancashire, England.

Events
The latter had been working in the vicinity of Singleton Bank signal box and was about to leave to clear the section for the express.

Victims
Seven were killed (the driver and six passengers) and 116 were injured.

Report
The signalman at Singleton misunderstood a telephone message which led him to make a serious error and accept the diesel train irregularly. The accident report also strongly criticised the local inspectors for allowing poor working practices.

References

Railway accidents and incidents in Lancashire
Railway accidents in 1961
1961 in England
Train collisions in England
Borough of Fylde
1960s in Lancashire
July 1961 events in the United Kingdom